Leck Air Base is located in Leck, Germany. It was closed as a military airport but a small portion remains open to public use. It was an important base during the Cold War because it served as an overflow to nearby bases. At Leck, ground and support crews from the United States and West Germany exchanged duties, learning how to perform aircraft maintenance and operational support tasks.

Between 1994 and 2012 it was home to German Air Force surface-to-air missile units, operating MIM-23 Hawk and Roland missiles, but is now inhabited by an electronic warfare battalion of the Joint Support Service.

External links
 Sportfluggruppe Leck e. V.

Installations of the United States Air Force in Germany
Installations of the German Air Force
Bases of the German Air Force
Defunct airports in Germany
Airports in Schleswig-Holstein